Buena Park is a train station in Buena Park, California, United States, served by Metrolink commuter rail. It is at the center of a transit-oriented development including townhomes and a housing complex owned by the California State University, Fullerton, near the corner of Dale Street and Malvern Avenue. The station is served by Metrolink's Orange County Line and 91 Line.

The station has a clock tower nearly 70 feet high which echoes a clock tower at nearby Knott's Berry Farm, itself a copy of Independence Hall in Philadelphia. The station includes a 300-car parking lot and a covered pedestrian overpass to allow passengers to cross the tracks.

Construction started in January 2006, and after many delays, the station opened on September 4, 2007. Construction cost $14 million.

The proposed alignment for the California High-Speed Rail project would require the loss of the station or the demolition of about 25 condominiums. The City of Buena Park joined other area municipalities to demand greater consultation from the High-Speed Rail Commission.  In response, the California High-Speed Rail Authority agreed to study the possibility of a "shared-track alignment" between Los Angeles and Anaheim that would not require the demolition of the present station or condominiums.

Amtrak(s) Pacific Surfliner and Southwest Chief passes through the station and does not stop in Buena Park.

Services

Rail 
Buena Park is served by Metrolink's Orange County and 91/Perris Valley Lines. Three tracks pass through the station, but only tracks 1 and 3 have platforms for passenger service.

Bus 
The station's driveway has two "zones" that are used for OCTA services.
 Zone 1
 Route  – Southbound to Huntington Beach via Beach Blvd
 Zone 2
 Route  – Eastbound to Anaheim Canyon Station via Malvern Ave, Chapman Ave, and Tustin Ave or southbound to Golden West Transportation Center in Huntington Beach via  Valley View St/Bolsa Chica Rd
 Route  – Southbound to Huntington Beach via Knott Ave and Goldenwest St or Northbound to Fullerton Park and Ride (where passengers can reach Metro Express 460) via Dale Ave

References

External links 
 
 Buena Park Metrolink Station at the City of Buena Park website

Metrolink stations in Orange County, California
Railway stations in the United States opened in 2007
Buena Park, California